The Château de Belpuig is a ruined castle in the commune of Prunet-et-Belpuig in the Pyrénées-Orientales département of France.

The castle was the seat of the Viscounts of Castelnou who reigned over the Vallespir region from the 10th to the 13th centuries.

The castle, a 15-minute walk from the village, occupies a strategic position on a rocky spur overlooking the surrounding countryside. The extensive panorama takes in the mountain ranges of Canigou, the Albères, the Corbières Massif and the coast of Languedoc and Roussillon.

See also
List of castles in France

References

External links
 Viscounts of Castelnou in French Wikipedia

Castles in Pyrénées-Orientales
Ruined castles in Occitania (administrative region)